VfL Osnabrück is a German multi-sport club in Osnabrück, Lower Saxony. It currently fields teams in basketball, gymnastics, swimming, table tennis, and tennis but is by far best known for its football section.

The football team currently plays in the 3. Liga, having been relegated from the 2. Bundesliga in 2021. They are coached by Tobias Schweinsteiger and captained by Marc Heider.

The club has the record for most seasons played in the 2. Bundesliga without ever playing in the Bundesliga, and is 10th in the 2. Bundesliga's all-time table.

History

Foundation to WW2
The club has its origins in the coming together on 17 April 1899 of the memberships of the "wild" clubs Antipodia, Germania, and Minerva to create Fußball Club 1899 Osnabrück. This group joined Osnabrücker Ballverein 05 in 1920 to play as BV 1899 Osnabrück.

Predecessor Osnabrücker BV 05 was the product of the 1905 merger of Fußball Club Edelweiß 1902 Osnabrück and Fußball Club Alemannia Osnabrück. This club made an appearance in the quarterfinals of the regional Westdeutsche (West German) final in 1910 where they were decisively put out (2–9) by Duisburger SV.

The merger that created Verein für Leibesübungen Osnabrück took place in 1924 when BV was joined by Spiel- und Sport Osnabrück. Prior to 1921, SuS had played as the football department of the gymnastics club Osnabrücker Turnverein 1861, created in 1914 when Fußball Club 1903 Olympia Osnabrück and Fußball Club Teutonia 1902 Osnabrück became part of TV.

Established 24 June 1902, Teutonia Osnabrück also had quarterfinal appearances in the Westdeutsche final to its credit, dropping decisions to FC München-Gladbach in 1908 (0–3), and BV Dortmund (3–4) in 1909.

VfL was formally incorporated on 8 March 1925, but part of the membership of the newly formed association soon left to create a separate side called Sportclub Rapid Osnabrück – styled after well known club Rapid Vienna. Rapid came back to the fold thirteen years later in 1938 and the re-unified club adopted the light-purple colours of the returning footballers.

After the re-structuring of German football leagues in 1933 under the Third Reich, Osnabrück played second division football until winning promotion to the Gauliga Niedersachsen (I) in 1935. They were relegated after their first campaign, but returned to the top flight in 1937, capturing the division title in the 1938–39 season. The Gauliga Niedersachsen was then split into two divisions, and in each of the following two seasons VfL took the Niedersachsen-Nord title. They went on win to the overall division title in 1940, beating Hannover 96 (3–2, 2–2), but lost their title to the same club the following year (1–1, 1–3). Their Gauliga titles in 1939 and 1940 put VfL into opening round group play for the national championship, but they were unable to advance.

Post-War era

After World War II, the club returned to play as 1. FSV Osnabrück but again took up their traditional name in 1946. The team played in the Oberliga Nord (I) and delivered credible performances that left them standing fourth in the league's all-time table behind well-known sides Hamburger SV, Werder Bremen, and FC St. Pauli.

Golden years
The Bundesliga was formed in 1963 as Germany's new nation-wide professional league. The club did not qualify for play there and were seeded into second division Regionalliga Nord. Osnabrück would never make it into the Bundesliga, but did enjoy lots of success in the early years of the Bundesliga era. VfL won the Regionalliga Nord three times in a row in 1969, 1970 and 1971, and finished as runners-up in 1972 and 1973. That meant five consecutive participations in the 'Aufstiegsrunde', where the best teams from each Regionalliga competed for a place in the Bundesliga. In their first attempt, in 1969, Osnabrück finished 2nd behind Rot-Weiss Essen, only losing once in the eight-game promotion playoff. That was the closest the club came to the Bundesliga; although they would finish second in the promotion playoff round twice more, the gap to first was bigger both times.

At this time, VfL Osnabrück also had very successful departments in basketball and table tennis, becoming German basketball champions in 1969.

2. Bundesliga regulars 
In 1974, a new national second division was introduced, although split into two North and South groups. Osnabrück played in the new 2. Bundesliga Nord, but could not repeat their previous achievements. In 1978-79, Osnabrück managed one of their most famous victories, a 5-4 win over Bayern Munich in the DFB-Pokal at the Olympiastadion, with a hat-trick from Andreas Wagner. In the league, the team was far less successful, finishing 18th out of 20. This would ordinarily have seen the team relegated, but they were saved by  St. Pauli and Westfalia Herne, who did not receive licenses for the next 2. Bundesliga season and had to be relegated despite finishing in the top half.

The 2. Bundesliga was reformed in 1981, becoming a single national league. A top half finish in the final year of the 2. Bundesliga Nord meant that Osnabrück qualified for the inaugural 2. Bundesliga season in 1981-82. Aside from a single season in the third tier Oberliga Nord, which they won, the club spent the entire decade in the second division. The high point of this spell was the sixth place finish in 1986-87, the club's best ever result in the division. A year later, the club made headlines by firing coach Anton Rudinski just one game into the 1988-89 season, in which they narrowly avoided relegation. That became a trend - in both 1990 and 1991, Osnabrück only managed to remain in the 2. Bundesliga thanks to late upturns in form.In 1992/93, the first year of a single 2. Bundesliga post reunification, Osnabrück were finally relegated to the Oberliga Nord. After one season in the Oberliga, the leagues were reorganised again and Osnabrück would finish runner up in the new Regionalliga Nord. Although that did not mean promotion, that did qualify VfL to compete for the German amateur football championship, which they won in 1995. In 1996, long-time president and sponsor Hartwig Piepenbrock stepped back.

21st century 
After a number of years in the Regionalliga Nord, Osnabrück were finally promoted back to the 2. Bundesliga in June 2000. Having won the Regionalliga Nord for the second year in a row, Osnabrück met Union Berlin in the promotion playoff, winning on penalties thanks to goalkeeper Uwe Brunn, who made three saves in the shootout and scored the decisive penalty. However, the club was immediately relegated back to the third tier. The club won promotion again in 2002-03, but coach Jürgen Gelsdorf surprisingly left the club after promotion, and the club finished last in the 2. Bundesliga in 2003-04.

After returning to the Regionalliga Nord, former player Claus-Dieter Wollitz was appointed coach. In his third season, 2006–07, Osnabrück were able to take second place in the league on the final day of the season, securing promotion. Wollitz was able to lead the team to safety in 2007-08, with a victory over Kickers Offenbach on the final day sending Offenbach down and putting Osnabrück in 12th place, their highest finish since 1988. The game was also the final appearance of Joe Enochs, who played more times for Osnabrück than any other player.

The following season, the club was relegated in controversial circumstances. After losing the relegation playoff, it emerged that defender Marcel Schuon was implicated in a match-fixing scandal, without which the club may have survived. Wollitz left the club, replaced by Karsten Baumann. Under Baumann, Osnabrück had a very successful season in 2009-10, winning the new 3. Liga and reaching the DFB-Pokal quarter finals with wins over Hamburger SV and Borussia Dortmund. Again, the club was relegated straight back down to the third tier in 2010-11, losing in the relegation playoff to Dynamo Dresden. During these years, the club developed a reputation as a 'Fahrstuhlmannschaft' (in English, a Yo-yo club).

That relegation began a spell of eight consecutive seasons in the 3. Liga. Claus-Dieter Wollitz returned in 2012, but left the team with one game remaining in the 2012-13 season after criticising the club's management. Osnabrück still finished third, qualifying for the promotion playoff, but lost to Dynamo Dresden again.

After a period of financial difficulty and little sporting success, the club returned to its traditional logo in 2017, while the name of the stadium also changed back from the Osnatel-Arena to the traditional name, Bremer Brücke. The 2017-18 season saw VfL almost relegated to the fourth tier, finishing 17th in the 3. Liga, with former player Daniel Thioune taking over as coach during the campaign, replacing Joe Enochs. 

In his first full season as coach, Thioune's Osnabrück won the 3. Liga title, winning promotion on the day the club celebrated their 120th anniversary. Back in the 2. Bundesliga, Osnabrück spent much of the season in the top half, and managed victories over big clubs like Hamburger SV and VfB Stuttgart, though they ultimately finished 13th.

Thioune left for Hamburg at the end of the campaign, and in the 2020-21 season (played mostly without fans due to the COVID-19 pandemic) the club went through two coaches, Marco Grote and Markus Feldhoff. Under Feldhoff, Osnabrück again finished in the relegation playoff spot, losing to FC Ingolstadt and returning to the 3. Liga.

Honours
 Gauliga Niedersachsen (I)
 Champions: 1939, 1940
 Regionalliga Nord (II)
 Champions: 1969, 1970, 1971
 Runners-up: 1972, 1973
 Oberliga Nord (III)
 Champions: 1985
 Regionalliga Nord (III)
 Champions: 1999, 2000
 Runners-up: 1995, 2003
 3. Liga (III)
 Champions: 2009–10, 2018–19
 German amateur championship
 Champions:1995
 Lower Saxony Cup (Tiers III-V)
 Winners: 2005, 2013, 2015, 2017

Players

Current squad

Out on loan

Stadium 

The club plays at the Stadion an der Bremer Brücke, commonly known simply as the Bremer Brücke. The stadium has also gone by the names, "Kampfbahn Bremer Brücke", "Piepenbrock-Stadion an der Bremer Brücke", and "Osnatel-Arena". It returned to the traditional name in 2017.

The stadium was built in 1931 by Rapid Osnabrück, who emerged from VfL and reunited in 1938. It has been the home ground of VfL Osnabrück ever since. It once had a capacity of over 30,000, but now holds just over 16,000.

In recent years, the possibility of the club moving to a new stadium has been suggested due to the limitations of the current ground. The stadium remains very popular with fans and was voted the most atmospheric stadium in the 3. Liga in an online poll.

Fans & club identity 
The club colours are purple and white, and the team is often referred to as die Lila-Weißen (The purple & whites). Home kits are usually primarily purple.

When the club celebrated its 120th anniversary in 2019, they wore a one-off black kit, inspired by the club's original colours. In the 2019-20 season, the home shirt was purple and black, combining the original colours with the normal purple.

The club has made statements against racism, wearing a special kit in 2018 with a message against the far right, and a special kit in 2022 with the message "Build Bridges!".

The "VfL Bündnis" alliance between the VfL Museum, Fanprojekt Osnabrück, the Violet Crew ultra group, and the club's fan department was recognised by the DFB in 2019 and awarded the Julius Hirsch Prize for their work in memory of Felix Löwenstein, a Jewish member and supporter of the club who was a victim of the Nazi regime killed in the Sandbostel camp in 1945. The VfL Museum had also advocated for a road next to the stadium to be renamed to the Felix-Löwenstein-Weg, which was done as part of the club's 120th anniversary.

Their main rivals are SC Preußen Münster.

Managerial history

Recent seasons
The recent season-by-season performance of the club:

Key

References

External links

 

 
Football clubs in Germany
Football clubs in Lower Saxony
Association football clubs established in 1899
1899 establishments in Germany
Sport in Osnabrück
2. Bundesliga clubs
3. Liga clubs